The Great Synagogue of Gibraltar, also known as Kahal Kadosh Sha'ar HaShamayim, is located in the British overseas territory of Gibraltar, and was the first synagogue on the Iberian Peninsula to operate since the expulsions from Spain and Portugal in 1492 and 1497 respectively.

History
Sha'ar HaShamayim Synagogue was founded in 1724 by Isaac Nieto from London. It was inaugurated in 1724 on a plot of land granted to the Jews by the then Governor of Gibraltar, Richard Kane. Having been rebuilt several times, the present building largely dates from 1812 and shares features in common with the parent Portuguese Synagogue (Amsterdam) (1675) and Bevis Marks Synagogue (1701).  The facade of the two-and-a-half-story, domestic-scale building features round-arched windows flanking a round-arched doorway.

Gallery

See also

Synagogues of Gibraltar
History of the Jews in Gibraltar
Sahar Hassamaim Synagogue
Synagogue of Funchal

References

1724 establishments in Europe
Orthodox Judaism in Europe
Orthodox synagogues
Religious organizations established in the 1720s
Sephardi Jewish culture in Europe
Sephardi synagogues
Spanish and Portuguese Jews
Synagogues completed in 1812
Synagogues in Gibraltar